Ryan Roth (born 10 January 1983) is a Canadian former professional road bicycle racer, who rode professionally between 2002 and 2019. Prior to becoming a road cyclist, Roth also competed in the junior levels in mountain-biking and cyclo-cross; he was national junior cyclo-cross champion in 2000.

Career
Born in Kitchener, Ontario, Roth competed as a professional from 2002, making his début with the Sympatico–Jet Fuel Coffee team. Having featured highly in several North and Central American races during his career, Roth won his first UCI Europe Tour race in April 2012, by winning the Tro-Bro Léon race. Roth soloed to victory in Lannilis after catching the breakaway and went clear of them, finishing thirteen seconds clear of his nearest rival, Benoit Jarrier of Véranda Rideau U. It was the first non-French victory in the race since Mark Renshaw in 2006, and was his team's first victory of the year. Roth also won the 2012 Canadian National Road Race Championships.

Major results

2000
 1st  Junior race, National Cyclo-cross Championships
2004
 1st Overall Multi Laser GP
 1st Classic Chlorophylle
 4th Univest Grand Prix
2005
 National Under-23 Road Championships
1st  Road race
2nd Time trial
 1st Overall Jewel in the Wilderness
1st Stages 1 & 2
2006
 1st Overall Jewel in the Wilderness
1st Stages 1a & 2
 1st Classique Montréal-Québec Louis Garneau
2007
 2nd Univest Grand Prix
 2nd Tour de Leelanau
2008
 1st Stage 11 International Cycling Classic
 2nd Time trial, National Road Championships
 2nd KW Classic
 3rd Overall Rochester Omnium
1st Stage 1 (ITT)
 3rd Copperas Cove Classic
2009
 1st Niagara Classic
 2nd Overall Jewel in the Wilderness
1st Stages 1 & 2
 6th Time trial, Pan American Road Championships
 6th Overall Vuelta a Cuba
2010
 1st Niagara Classic
 2nd Chrono Gatineau
 3rd Time trial, National Road Championships
 4th Overall Vuelta a Cuba
1st Stage 7a (ITT)
 8th Overall Tour de Beauce
 10th Time trial, Commonwealth Games
2011
 1st Univest Grand Prix
2012
 1st  Road race, National Road Championships
 1st Tro-Bro Léon
 8th Overall Tour de Beauce
2014
 National Road Championships
2nd Road race
3rd Time trial
 7th Winston-Salem Cycling Classic
 8th Overall Grand Prix Cycliste de Saguenay
 8th Philadelphia International Championship
 9th Overall Tour de Beauce
2015
 National Road Championships
2nd Time trial
3rd Road race
 2nd Overall Grand Prix Cycliste de Saguenay
 5th Overall Tour de Beauce
 6th White Spot / Delta Road Race
 8th Philadelphia International Cycling Classic
2016
 1st  Time trial, National Road Championships
 1st  Overall Grand Prix Cycliste de Saguenay
 1st Winston-Salem Cycling Classic
 1st White Spot / Delta Road Race
2017
 2nd Winston-Salem Cycling Classic
2019
 6th Overall Tour de Iskandar Johor
1st Points classification
1st Stage 1

References

External links
Spidertech profile

1983 births
Canadian male cyclists
Cross-country mountain bikers
Cyclists at the 2010 Commonwealth Games
Cyclo-cross cyclists
Living people
Sportspeople from Kitchener, Ontario
Commonwealth Games competitors for Canada